Debre Sina is a town in Amhara Region, Ethiopia. Although the district was named after this town, the administrative center of the Debre Sina district is located in Mekane Selam. Debre Sina is located along Ethiopian Highway 2. Just west of Debre Sina, the national highway reaches its highest point at 3120 meters above sea level. Just below the top of the Termaber pass, a tunnel was constructed by the Italians in 1938. The highest elevations along this escarpment reach beyond 3300 meters.

Hydrologically, Debre Sina is located in the Afar endoreic basin. Just to the west of Debre Sina, the Termaber pass crosses the continental divide into the Jamma River and Nile basin.

History

20th century 
During the Italian occupation, the Termaber Pass was referred to as the "passo Mussolini".

References

Further reading and external links 
Populated places in the Amhara Region